Ihlebæk is a Norwegian surname. Notable people with the surname include:

Hans Andreas Ihlebæk (1930–1993), Norwegian journalist
Oscar Ihlebæk (1900–1945), Norwegian newspaper editor and resistance member

Norwegian-language surnames